Silhouettia silhouettae is a species of air-breathing land snail, terrestrial pulmonate gastropod mollusk in the family Streptaxidae.

Silhouettia silhouettae is the only species within the genus Silhouettia.

Distribution 
Silhouettia silhouettae is endemic to Silhouette Island, the Seychelles.

References

Streptaxidae